The Throne Celebration in Morocco is a national occasion celebrated on 30 July of each year, punctuated by several official and popular celebrations, it commemorates the day of the King's accession to the throne. The first celebration was held in 1933 to recognise the accession of Mohammed V of Morocco in 1927. The current King Mohammed VI succeeded his father on 23 July 1999 and officially took the throne on 30 July.  On the occasion, several nationwide events are covered on public television, including official activities.

History 
The first celebration was in 1933 in honour of King Mohammed V, and was thereafter held on November 18 each year. The date moved to March 3 during the rule of the late King Hassan II (1961-1999). When King Mohammed VI took the throne in 1999, it moved again to July 30.

Throne Speech  
The Throne Speech is given on the 30 July, when the King addresses the nation on official State TV, giving an inventory of events and projects completed during the previous year, and discusses the future vision and foreign policies of the kingdom. According to Article 52 of the Constitution of Morocco of 2011, the King has to address both the nation and parliament in order to make the Throne Speech binding to the nation and to the authorities.

References 

Moroccan culture